New Clark City Aquatic Center is a swimming and diving venue at the New Clark City in Capas, Tarlac, Philippines. It is one of the venues of the New Clark City Sports Hub, which is part of the National Government Administrative Center. It hosted the aquatics events of the 2019 Southeast Asian Games and is set to host the 2023 Asian Swimming Championships.

History
The construction of the whole New Clark City Sports Hub, which also includes the Aquatics Center, began on April 25, 2018 with a cement-pouring ceremony. By early July 2019, the aquatics center is already 85 percent complete. The venue is completed by August 2019 in time with the Philippine Swimming National Open as the first event hosted in the venue.

Architecture
The Bases Conversion Development Authority commissioned local architecture firm, Budji + Royal Architecture + Design to work on the New Clark City Sports Hub.

The Aquatics Center's design was derived from the baklad a local fish trap, and the Filipino weaving and woodwork and exhibits a bamboo color theme. The design consist of a huge open shed with a prismatic roof similar to a parol made of capiz coating. The roofing will be made from polytetrafluoroethylene (PTFE), a fiberglass material used for its lightweight property, durability, and weather resistance. The architects intends to cover the facility but still let natural light into its interior. At daytime, the architects intended the roof to resemble capiz windows used by old Philippine houses and at night the roof will be illuminated to resemble a lit parol.

Facilities

Pools and equipment

The Aquatics Center has a two-level bleachers with a seating capacity of 2,000. Above the bleachers is a furnished and air-conditioned VIP lounge.

It hosts three swimming pools, an Olympic pool, a training pool, and a diving pool. All pools have hot-steel siding and PVC linings installed. The aquatics venue also has an underwater sound system. Besides the bleachers on the ground floor. is a dryland training area

Each of the pool's ten lanes are equipped with lap-timers in lieu of flip charts used traditionally in other aquatics venues. The diving pool is equipped with five diving platforms.

Adjacent to the bleachers is a dryland training area which hosts a foam diving area, trampolines, and stretch equipment for athletes.

The pools at the facility is accredited by the Fédération Internationale de Natation (FINA), an international sport governing body for water sports.

Other
The facility's entrance is connected to the main road by a vehicle ramp while pedestrians including persons with disabilities can access the stadium through its side entry points. The lower ground floor hosts parking spaces for 26 cars and ten buses.

Use

The aquatics center can be used for swimming and other water sports. The training pool while intended as a practice venue for athletes participating in international tournaments could also be used to hold local competitions. The Philippine Swimming National Open was held from August 31 to September 3, 2019 as the first event. The facility hosted the aquatics events, including water polo, as part of the 2019 Southeast Asian Games. and it is also set to host the 2021 Asian Swimming Championships in November 2021.

Gallery

See also
New Clark City Athletics Stadium

References

Swimming venues in the Philippines
Diving venues
New Clark City
Buildings and structures in Tarlac
Sports venues completed in 2019